Parsigutta is an area in Secunderabad, Telangana, India. It is famous for residential houses and temples. It comes under Boudhanagar Municipal Division and Secunderabad Assembly and Loksabha Constituency. 

It comprises New Ashok Nagar, Sanjeevapuram, L.N.Nagar, Amber Nagar, Alladi RajKumar Nagar.

Culture 

The neighbourhood is a mixed culture of religions including Hindus, Muslims, Christians and Parsis after whom the locality is named. Ganesh Chaturthi  and Navaratri festivals are grandly celebrated here by placing Ganesh and Maa Durga idols. Also Ramzan and Christmas festivals are celebrated

Since a decade, every year in New Ashok Nagar there will be Rangoli Competition held for hundreds of women at the Community Hall near Pochamma Temple Lane on the eve of Sankranthi (14 January) and the prizes will be distributed on 26 January. Women from surrounding areas also participate enthusiastically in this competition and make the festival and roads colourful.

Shirdi Sai Baba and Sri Anjaneya temple are famous temples in Parsigutta, situated near New MCH Colony Community hall. Every year in this temple Hanuman Jayanthi, Vinayaka Chavathi and Sri Rama Navami are celebrated and AnnaDanam is organized.

Transport 

Parsigutta is near to Secunderabad Railway Station and is surrounded by Padmarao nagar, Warsiguda, Ramnagar and Musheerabad. The largest fish market in the city is located near this area.

The area is well connected by road. TSRTC Bus No. 44 commutes from Secunderabad Rathifile bus stand to Parsigutta frequently. Also many private vehicles provide their services to commute.

Development 

This area is gradually developing. All main centres, such as hospitals and main bus stands, are nearby. Many professors from Osmania University are from Parsigutta.

References 

Neighbourhoods in Hyderabad, India